E. J. Potter (April 24, 1941 - April 30, 2012), a.k.a. the Michigan Madman, was an American dragstrip exponent. Writing his obituary in 2012, Paul Vitello of the New York Times described him as a "legend".

Life
Born in Ithaca, Michigan, Elon Jack Potter grew up on a farm repairing tractor engines, which led to building motorcycles. In high school, he wondered if he could build a bike with a V8 engine. The bike he built, named "Bloody Mary", was tested at a local strip and reached .

He later built a three-wheeled motorcycle with a United States military surplus rocket engine. "The Widowmaker" set three world land speed records. Potter's other creations include putting a jet engine in a Motorized tricycle and putting WWII airplane engines into tractors for tractor pull competitions.

Beginning soon after his high school graduation, Potter toured the racing circuit for 13 years with his creations.

Legacy
In 2017, Potter's  1971 Widowmaker 7 went up for auction in Las Vegas.
Potter's motorcycles were featured on an episode of American Pickers in 2019.

References

External links
E.J. Potter's 'Whizzer' Drag Bike at Museum of American Speed

2012 deaths
American motorcycle racers
American stunt performers
Motorcycle stunt performers
1941 births